Liberation is the debut studio album by Norwegian black metal band 1349. It was released on 15 February 2003 through Candlelight Records.

Track listing 
 "Manifest" – 4:05
 "I Breathe Spears" – 4:26
 "Riders of the Apocalypse" – 4:36
 "Deathmarch" – 1:07
 "Pitch Black" – 3:20
 "Satanic Propaganda" – 3:44
 "Legion" – 4:56
 "Evil Oath" – 3:48
 "Liberation" – 5:21
 "Buried by Time and Dust" (Mayhem cover, bonus track) – 3:05

Personnel 
 Archaon – guitar
 Tjalve – guitar
 Frost – drums
 Seidemann – bass
 Ravn – vocals
 Thomas Sorlie – engineering
 Charlotte Hakonsen – cover concept, artwork

References 

2003 debut albums
1349 (band) albums
Candlelight Records albums